Duane Ticknor He is a former assistant coach for the Memphis Grizzlies and a former NBA D-League head coach for the Fort Wayne Mad Ants and Sioux Falls Skyforce and Sacramento Kings.

Biography
Ticknor is a native of Vermillion, South Dakota where he played basketball at Vermillion High School. He initially played basketball at Southern State College before transferring to the University of South Dakota where he played for the USD Coyotes. He graduated in 1978.

Ticknor became an assistant at Southern State and later, its head coach. After the college closed in 1984, Ticknor moved on to National College.

Fort Wayne Mad Ants
The Mad Ants hired Ticknor in 2012. Ticknor guided the Mad Ants to a 27-23 record and helped the team make their first NBA D-League playoff appearance.

Memphis Grizzlies
Ticknor joined the Grizzlies just before the 2013–14 NBA season. During his first year with the team, the Grizzlies made the 2014 NBA Playoffs, but they lost in the first round to the Oklahoma City Thunder in seven games.

Sacramento Kings
On June 3, 2016, Ticknor joined the Sacramento Kings as an assistant coach.

References

External links
An interview with Ticknor can be found here

Living people
College men's basketball head coaches in the United States
Continental Basketball Association coaches
Dakota Wizards coaches
Fort Wayne Mad Ants coaches
High school basketball coaches in the United States
Memphis Grizzlies assistant coaches
Sioux Falls Skyforce coaches
Year of birth missing (living people)